"I Love My Country" is a song recorded by American country music duo Florida Georgia Line. It was released in March 2020 as the first single from their fifth studio album Life Rolls On, and was included on their 6-Pack EP.

Content
The duo released the song on March 27, 2020. Corey Crowder co-wrote the song with Ernest Keith Smith, Charlie Handsome, Kane Brown, Chase McGill, and Will Weatherly, and also produced it.  USA Today referred to the song as a "country-rock jam tailor-made for summertime."

Billy Dukes of Taste of Country called the song "the kind of country-rocker they built their live show on" and noted the "banjo, heavy drum beats and electric guitars" in the production. Jon Freeman of Rolling Stone Country thought that the song showed influence from country music of the 1990s.

Charts

Weekly charts

Year-end charts

Certifications

References

2020 songs
2020 singles
Florida Georgia Line songs
Big Machine Records singles
Songs written by Kane Brown
Songs written by Corey Crowder (songwriter)
Songs written by Ernest (musician)
Songs written by Chase McGill
Country rock songs
American patriotic songs